Probenecid with colchicine is a combination medication used to treat gout. Brand names include ColBenemid, Col-Probenecid, and Proben-C.

References

Antigout agents